Woodlawn Cemetery is one of the largest cemeteries in New York City and a designated National Historic Landmark. Located south of Woodlawn Heights, Bronx, New York City, it has the character of a rural cemetery. Woodlawn Cemetery opened during the Civil War in 1863, in what was then southern Westchester County, in an area that was annexed to New York City in 1874. It is notable in part as the final resting place of some well known figures.

Locale and grounds

Built on rolling hills, its tree-lined roads lead to some unique memorials, some designed by famous American architects: McKim, Mead & White, John Russell Pope, James Gamble Rogers, Cass Gilbert, Carrère and Hastings, Sir Edwin Lutyens, Beatrix Jones Farrand, and John La Farge. The cemetery contains seven Commonwealth war graves – six British and Canadian servicemen of World War I and an airman of the Royal Canadian Air Force of World War II. In 2011, Woodlawn Cemetery was designated a National Historic Landmark, since it shows the transition from the rural cemetery popular at the time of its establishment to the more orderly 20th-century cemetery style.

As of 2007, plot prices at Woodlawn were reported as $200 per square foot, $4,800 for a gravesite for two, and up to $1.5 million for land to build a family mausoleum.

Burials moved to Woodlawn
Woodlawn was the destination for many human remains disinterred from cemeteries in more densely populated parts of New York City:
 Rutgers Street church graves were moved to Woodlawn. Most graves were re-interred with a stated date of December 20, 1866 into the Rutgers Plot, lots 147–170.
 West Farms Dutch Reformed Church, at Boone Avenue and 172nd Street in The Bronx, had most of its graves moved to Woodlawn Cemetery in 1867 and interred in the Rutgers Plot, Lots 214–221.
 Bensonia Cemetery, also known as "Morrisania Cemetery", was originally a Native American burial ground. The graves were moved to Woodlawn Cemetery with a stated date of April 21, 1871 and re-interred into Lot 3.  Public School #138, in The Bronx, is now on the site.
 Harlem Church Yard cemetery internees were moved to Woodlawn.  Most graves were re-interred with a stated date of August 1, 1871 into the Sycamore Plot, lots 1061–1080.
 Nagle Cemetery remains were moved in November–December 1926 and reinterred in Primrose Plot, Lot 16150.  Identities of those interred are apparently unknown.
 The Dyckman-Nagle Burying Ground, West 212th Street at 9th Avenue, in the Borough of Manhattan, was originally established in 1677 and originally contained 417 plots. In 1905, the remains, with the exception of Staats Morris Dyckman and his family, were removed. By 1927, the Dyckman graves were finally moved to Woodlawn Cemetery. The former Dutch colonial-era cemetery is now a 207th Street subway train yard.

The fictional cemetery of the Synagogue in Brooklyn in the film Once Upon a Time in America is actually located here, renamed "Riverdale Cemetery".

Notable burials

Numerous notable persons have been interred at Woodlawn Cemetery including: Chief Justice of the United States Charles Evans Hughes; actress Cicely Tyson, aviation pioneer Harriet Quimby, performer, playwright and producer George M Cohan; gangster Bumpy Johnson; authors Nellie Bly, Countee Cullen, Clarence Day, Damon Runyon, E.L. Doctorow, Herman Melville, and Dorothy Parker; musicians Irving Berlin, Miles Davis,  Duke Ellington, W. C. Handy, Fritz Kreisler, Pigmeat Markham, King Oliver, and Max Roach; singers Celia Cruz and Florence Mills; husband and wife magicians Alexander Herrmann and Adelaide Herrmann; sportswriter Grantland Rice; gunfighter and US marshal Bat Masterson; developer of the Rolfing body therapy and noted female biochemist Ida Rolf; and, businessmen such as shipping magnate Archibald Gracie, cosmetics manufacturer Richard Hudnut, America's first self-made millionaire woman Madame CJ Walker, department store founder Rowland Hussey Macy, and variety store mogul F. W. Woolworth.  A large number of New York brewers (e.g., the Haffens of Haffen Brewing Company) are interred there on "Brewer's Row", along with a dozen other brewing scions and their families.

Conservancy
The Woodlawn Conservancy is a 501 (c) (3) associated with Woodlawn Cemetery. It began as the Friends of Woodlawn in 1999.  It enhances the mission of Woodlawn through fundraising, educational opportunities and outreach with other non-profits. In 2021, over 40 stones were conserved in a joint effort between the Woodlawn Conservancy, the Friends of the Rye African-American Cemetery, World Monuments Fund, and the Jay Heritage Center. The preservation effort was launched to coincide with the new federal Juneteenth celebration.

Gallery

See also

 List of cemeteries in New York
 List of cemeteries in the United States
 List of mausolea
 List of National Historic Landmarks in New York City
 List of New York City Landmarks
National Register of Historic Places listings in the Bronx
 Rural Cemetery Act

References

External links 

 Woodlawn Official Page
 
 Photographs of graves of famous persons in Woodlawn
 Woodlawn Cemetery Records are held by the Drawings and Archives Department of the Avery Architectural and Fine Arts Library, Columbia University

Cemeteries in the Bronx
Tourist attractions in the Bronx
National Historic Landmarks in New York City
Cemeteries on the National Register of Historic Places in New York (state)
National Register of Historic Places in the Bronx
1863 establishments in New York (state)
 
Rural cemeteries